Bath Island  is an affluent and posh neighbourhood in Clifton, Karachi, Sindh, Pakistan.Saddar Town - Government of Karachi </ref>

There are several ethnic groups including Muhajirs, Sindhis, Punjabis, Kashmiris, Seraikis, Pakhtuns, Balochis, Memons, Bohras and Ismailis.

References

Neighbourhoods of Karachi